Karena Ng is a Hong Kong actress and model.

Career 
Ng started off in 2010 in an advertisement for Tempo tissue paper. In 2011, Ng started her acting career in the Hong Kong comedy Magic to Win directed by Wilson Yip. She was nominated for the Best New Performer award in the 31st Hong Kong Film Awards. More recently, she acted in Ip Man 3 as a single teacher Miss Wong.

In 2021, Kara Wai and Hugo Ng Doi-Yung starred in the movie "Sunshine of my life" as a blind parent of a normal child, played by Ng.

Filmography

Films

References

External links
 
 Karena Ng Chin-Yu at hkmdb.com
 Karena Ng Qian Yu at hkcinemagic.com
 Karena Ng at chinesemov.com

1993 births
Living people
21st-century Hong Kong actresses
Hong Kong female models